Sunday Ramadhan Manara (born 23 November 1952) is a Tanzanian former footballer who played as a winger.

Career

Nicknamed 'Computer', in 1977, Manara signed for Dutch side Heracles Almelo, becoming the first Tanzanian to play in Europe. In 1979, he signed for New York Eagles in the United States. Before the second half of 1979–90, he signed for Austrian club St. Veit. After that, Manara signed for Al Nasr in the United Arab Emirates.

References

External links

 

1952 births
2. Liga (Austria) players
Al-Nasr SC (Dubai) players
American Soccer League (1933–1983) players
Association football wingers
Eerste Divisie players
Expatriate footballers in Austria
Expatriate footballers in the Netherlands
Expatriate footballers in the United Arab Emirates
Expatriate soccer players in the United States
Heracles Almelo players
Living people
New York Eagles players
Tanzania international footballers
Tanzanian expatriate footballers
Tanzanian expatriate sportspeople in the United Arab Emirates
Tanzanian expatriate sportspeople in the United States
Tanzanian Premier League players
UAE Pro League players
Young Africans S.C. players
Tanzanian footballers
Tanzanian expatriate sportspeople in the Netherlands
Tanzanian expatriate sportspeople in Austria